Greatest Hits is a compilation album by Australian country music artist Troy Cassar-Daley. The album is due for release on 19 October 2018.

The 42-track album includes tracks from all of Cassar-Daley's studio albums and includes two brand new singles including the opening track "Wouldn't Change a Thing" and "Shadows On the Hill" from the ABC television series Mystery Road. A national tour to support the album is set to commence in January 2019.

In a statement Cassar-Daley said: "Looking back over this collection of songs across my whole career I can reflect on the great times such as celebrating my first Golden Guitar or ARIA Award and in contrast the periods where I have doubted myself and my music, felt alone. But at the end of the day, I say to myself 'I wouldn't change a thing'."

Reception
Jeff Jenkins from Stack Magazine described the album as "Heartfelt and honest" and called Cassar-Daley "one of the great Australian country writers."

Track listing

Charts

Weekly charts

Year-end charts

Release history

References

2018 greatest hits albums
Troy Cassar-Daley albums
Liberation Records albums
Compilation albums by Australian artists